, or Bisen for short (ビセン), is an art school located in Kita-ku, Sapporo, Hokkaido, Japan, which was established in 1961.

History 
1961 - Shirayuki Institute of Arts (Shirayuki Bijyutsu Kenkyusho in Japanese) was established in Nishi-ku, Sapporo. Shirayuki stands for White Snow. 
1966 - Shirayuki Institute of Arts moved to Kita-ku, Sapporo and it was renamed Hokkaido Art School (Hokkaido Bijyutsu Gakko in Japanese). 
1976 - Hokkaido Art School was renamed Hokkaido College of Comprehensive Arts (Hokkaido Sogo Bijyutsu Senmon Gakko in Japanese). 
1983 - The International Exchange Program started with the Emily Carr University of Art and Design in Canada. Douglas Coupland came as the first exchange student.
1991 - The International Exchange Program started with Plymouth University in England.
1992 - Douglas Coupland, the first student of the international exchange programs, published a book "Generation X." This book became very popular, selling 100,000 copies in United States. Also, Isao Yamada, who belongs to the fifth consecutive graduating year, was praised for his film "I've Heard the Ammonite Murmur" among independent films at the Cannes Film Festival.
1994 - Hokkaido College of Comprehensive Arts took part in an event of the International Association of Independent Art and Design Schools (AIAS), which was held in Paris, and became a member. 
1996 - Hokkaido College of Comprehensive Arts was renamed Hokkaido College of Art and Design. Also, the International Exchange Program started with Capilano University in Canada.

Faculties 
Specialist Courses (Daytime)
Department of Industrial Design
Graphic Design Course 
Illustration Course
 Department of Multimedia Design 
CG・Web Design Course
Animation・Game Creator Course 
Department of Environmental Design 
Interior Design Course 
Interior Coordination Course 
Craft Design Course 
Flower Design Course 
Department of Architectural Design 
The Second-Class Registered Architect Course 
House and Shop Design Course
General Courses (Nighttime) 
Department of Comprehensive Design and Modeling 
Fine Art Course 
Graphic Design Course 
Illustration Course 
CG・Web Design Course 
Comprehensive Interior Design Course

Sister schools
Capilano University
Emily Carr University of Art and Design
Plymouth University
Hokkaido College of Radiology & Pharmacy

Notable alumni and alumna
Manga Artist
Akiko Monden
Masaaki Nakayama
Yuji Iwahara
Karuho Shiina
Masasumi Kakizaki
Yuki Ota

Illustrator 
Masami Nishimura
Yoshikatsu Kuriyama
Suzuki Yasushi
Kurando Ikeda
Umiu-Geso
Shiori Matsuura

Art Director 
Eiji Sakagawa
Kenji Yamamoto
Ryohei Kudo (Wabi-Sabi)
Naoki Fujita
Junya Kamata

Film Director 
Isao Yamada

Picture Book Author 
Mari Kasai

Fine Artist
Toshiya Kobayashi
Kenji Nagahama
Yumiko Kayukawa

Novelist & Artist
Douglas Coupland (an exchange student from Emily Carr University of Art and Design in 1983)

References

External links
  Official website (Japanese)
 AIAS(International Association of Independent Art and Design Schools)

Art schools in Japan
Universities and colleges in Sapporo